The men's football tournament has been a regular Asian Games sporting event since the 1951 edition, while the women's tournament began in 1990.

History

The first Asian Games had football tournament.

Since the 2002 Asian Games, age limit for men teams is under-23 plus up to three overage players for each squad, same as the age limit in football competitions at the Summer Olympics. 

Although Kazakhstan is a member of the Olympic Council of Asia, they cannot participate in football due to their football federation KFF has been a member of the UEFA since 2002. The same rule applies to the Guam and Australia are members of the AFC, but they are members of Oceania National Olympic Committees.

Japan is the only nation to have won both Gold medals of Men's and Women's tournament in an Asian Games (2010).

Men's tournaments

Summaries
{| border=1 style="border-collapse:collapse; font-size:90%; text-align:center; width:100%" cellpadding=2 cellspacing=0

|- bgcolor=#C1D8FF
!rowspan=2|Ed.
!rowspan=2|Year
!rowspan=2|Host
!width=1% rowspan=2 bgcolor=ffffff|
!colspan=3|Final
!width=1% rowspan=2 bgcolor=ffffff|
!colspan=3|Third Place
|- bgcolor=#EFEFEF
!width=15%|Gold Medal
!width=10%|Score
!width=15%|Silver Medal
!width=15%|Bronze Medal
!width=10%|Score
!width=15%|Fourth Place
|-
| colspan=10 style=background:#efefef text-align:center | National teams tournament (1951–1998)
|- bgcolor=#F5FAFF
|1
|1951 details
| New Delhi
!width=1% rowspan=13 bgcolor=ffffff|
|
|0–1
|
!width=1% rowspan=13 bgcolor=ffffff|
|
|2–0
|

|- bgcolor=#D0E7FF
|2
|1954 details
| Manila
|
|5–2
|
|
|5–4
|

|- bgcolor=#F5FAFF
|3
|1958 details
| Tokyo
|
|3–2
|
|
|4–1
|

|- bgcolor=#D0E7FF
|4
|1962 details
| Jakarta
|
|2–1
|
|
|4–1
|

|- bgcolor=#F5FAFF
|5
|1966 details
| Bangkok
|
|1–0
|
|
|2–0
|

|- bgcolor=#D0E7FF
|6
|1970 details
| Bangkok
|  
|0–0 (a.e.t.)1
|
|
|1–0
|

|- bgcolor=#F5FAFF
|7
|1974 details
| Tehran
|
|1–0
|
|
|2–1
|

|- bgcolor=#D0E7FF
|8
|1978 details
| Bangkok
|  
|0–0 (a.e.t.)1
|
|
|1–0
|

|- bgcolor=#F5FAFF
|9
|1982  details
| New Delhi
|
|1–0
|
|
|2–02
|

|- bgcolor=#D0E7FF
|10
|1986 details
| Seoul
|
|2–0
|
|
|5–0
|

|- bgcolor=#F5FAFF
|11
|1990 details
| Beijing
|
|0–0 (a.e.t.)  (4–1 p)
|
|
|1–0
|

|- bgcolor=#D0E7FF
|12
|1994 details
| Hiroshima
|
|4–2
|
|
|2–1
|

|- bgcolor=#F5FAFF
|13
|1998 details
| Bangkok
|
|2–0
|
|
|3–0
|
|-
| colspan=10 style=background:#efefef text-align:center | Under-23 National teams tournament (2002–present)
|- bgcolor=#D0E7FF
|14
|2002 details
| Busan
!width=1% rowspan=13 bgcolor=ffffff|
|
|2–1
|
!width=1% rowspan=13 bgcolor=ffffff|
|
|3–0
|

|- bgcolor=#F5FAFF
|15
|2006  details
| Doha
|
|1–0
|
|
|1–0 (a.e.t.)
|

|- bgcolor=#D0E7FF
|16
|2010  details
| Guangzhou
|
|1–0
|
|
|4–3
|

|- bgcolor=#F5FAFF
|17
|2014 details| Incheon
|
|1–0 (a.e.t.)
|
|
|1–0
|
|- bgcolor=#D0E7FF
|18
|2018 details| Jakarta–Palembang
|
|2–1 (a.e.t.)
|
|
|1–1(4–3 p)
|
|- bgcolor=#F5FAFF
|19
|2022 details| Hangzhou
|
|
|
|
|
|
|- bgcolor=#D0E7FF
|20
|2026 details| Aichi–Nagoya
|
|
|
|
|
|
|- bgcolor=#F5FAFF
|21
|2030 details| Doha
|
|
|
|
|
|
|- bgcolor=#D0E7FF
|22
|2034 details| Riyadh
|
|
|
|
|
|
|}
*Under-23 tournament since 2002. 
1 The title was shared. 
2 Saudi Arabia were awarded the third-place playoff by default after the Korea DPR team were handed a two-year suspension for assaulting officials at the end of their semi-final. 
3 2022 Asian Games men's qualifying has been postponed due to COVID-19 pandemic

Medal table

* = hostTop scorers

Participating nationsFootball at the Asian Games was a senior tournament until 1998.Football at the Asian Games has been an under-23 tournament since 2002.Women's tournaments

Summaries
The first women's tournament was held in the 1990 Asian Games.

Medal table

* = host''

Participating nations

Top scorers

Winning coaches

See also
Football at the Summer Olympics
Beach soccer at the Asian Beach Games
FIFA

References
RSSSF archive

External links
 

 
Asian Games
Sports at the Asian Games
Women's association football competitions in Asia
Asian Games